Purno Doirgho Prem Kahini also known by initialism as PDPK, is a 2013 Bangladeshi romance film written by Rumman Rashid Khan and directed by Shafi Uddin Shafi. The film stars Shakib Khan, Joya Ahsan, and Arifin Shuvoo with Razzak, Anwara, Diti, Subrata, Lamia Mimo and Saju Khadem in supporting roles.

The plot of the film revolves around Joy, an aeronautical engineer who goes to Malaysia to find his long-lost aunt, and falls in love with Zara. Shakib, a billionaire businessman and Zara's childhood friend, also confesses his love for her. The film takes a dramatic turn when Joy discovers that Zara is the daughter of his aunt while Shakib plots to make Zara fall in love with him.

Purnodoirgho Prem Kahini was theatrically released on 16 October 2013, on the occasion of Eid al-Adha. The film opened to major critical success and earned numerous accolades. It received six Meril Prothom Alo Awards nominations, with Khan winning Best Actor and Ahsan winning Best Actress. The film had the longest theatrical run in 2013, completing over 100 days at the box office. The film was a blockbuster at the box office, and one of the biggest film of 2013. Due to the film's commercial success, the producers announced a sequel titled Purno Doirgho Prem Kahini Two, which was released on 8 April 2016.

Plot
The film is about Joy (Shakib Khan) who is engaged to his cousin Mitu (Mimo). But he promises his grandfather that he will not tie the knot before he finds his missing aunt and uncle. In search of his missing relatives, he goes to Malaysia, where he meets a girl Zara (Jaya Ahsan) who is a UN employee. They become familiar with each other and Zara helps Joy find his aunt.
Joy, appreciative of her companionship and help, falls for Zara. To avoid him, Zara gets involved with another man Shakib Ahmed (Arifin Shuvoo). In this situation, the climax of the film comes down between responsibility towards family, relatives and love affairs.

Cast

 Shakib Khan as Joy Shikder
 Joya Ahsan as Zara Haque
 Arifin Shuvoo as Shakib Ahmed
 Razzak as Samad Shikdar
 Anwara as Rokeya Begum
 Parveen Sultana Diti as Nishat Shikdar
 Subrata as Dr. Shamsul Haque
 Mimo as Mitu Shikder
 Shaju Khadem as Sentu
 Sohel Rana as the Narrator
 Bobita as the Narrator

Music

The soundtrack for the film is composed by Showkat Ali Emon and Kaushik Hossain Taposh composed one songs as guest composers, with the lyrics penned by Kabir Bakul. The soundtrack features 7 tracks overall. The song "O Priyo Ami Tomar Hote Chai" was released as a promotional single, the video of the song "Ami Nissho Hoye Jabo Janona" was released on 23 July 2013. The Third Video Song "Akash Hote Ami Chai" was released on YouTube on 7 October 2013 and was well received by Critics and Audiences. O Priyo Ami Tomar Hote Chai video song was released on YouTube on 8 October 2013. Hamilon Er Pagla Bashi and Ek Mutho Roddur Was Released on 10 October 2013.

Reception
 The film completed 50 days in 20 centers.
 The film completed 100 days in 6 centers.

Awards

Sequel
The original production team had announced plans to make a sequel called Purno Doirgho Prem Kahini 2. the sequel will retain leads Shakib Khan and Joya Ahsan, while Mamnun Hasan Emon and Moushumi Hamid is a new addition to the cast and is released on 8 April 2016 to positive response from Critic and audience.

References

External links
 
  Purno Doirgho Prem Kahini at the Bangladesh Movie Database

2013 films
2013 romantic drama films
Bengali-language Bangladeshi films
Bangladeshi romantic drama films
Films scored by Shawkat Ali Emon
Films scored by Koushik Hossain Taposh
2010s Bengali-language films